Alexandre Perahia (born 23 July 1962) is a French rower. He competed in the men's coxless pair event at the 1988 Summer Olympics.

References

External links
 
 

1962 births
Living people
French male rowers
Olympic rowers of France
Rowers at the 1988 Summer Olympics
Place of birth missing (living people)